Jackie Shroff (born 1 February 1957) is an Indian actor. He has been in the Hindi cinema (Bollywood) industry for almost four decades and till now has appeared in more than 250 films in thirteen languages (Hindi, Tamil, Telugu, Konkani, Kannada, Marathi, Odia, Punjabi, Bengali, Malayalam, Bhojpuri, Gujarati and English). He has won four Filmfare Awards among other accolades. He has also appeared in several successful short films.

Hindi

Tamil

Telugu

Bengali

Marathi

Kannada

Malayalam

Punjabi

Bhojpuri

Konkani

Television

References

External links
 Jackie Shroff filmography on IMDb

Indian filmographies
Male actor filmographies